Aleksandar Gaćeša (born September 1988 in Belgrade, Serbia, SFR Yugoslavia) is a Serbian professional basketball player. He is a 1.95 guard. He played for KK Sloboda Užice.

External links
 Aleksandar Gacesa Player Profile
 Aleksandar Gacesa Promo
 Video 12/13
 Video 08/09
 Picture of Aleksandar Gacesa

Living people
1988 births
Serbian expatriate basketball people in Montenegro
Basketball players from Belgrade
Serbian men's basketball players
Guards (basketball)